Rogozinski or Rogoziński (feminine: Rogozińska; plural: Rogozińscy) is a Polish surname. Notable people with this surname include:

 Jacques Rogozinski (born 1950), Mexican economist and public official
 Maria Rogozińska (died 1943), Polish farmer and Righteous Among the Nations
 Stefan Szolc-Rogoziński (1861–1896), Polish explorer

See also
 
 

Polish-language surnames